"Daydreamer" is a song by English dubstep producer and DJ Flux Pavilion. The song was released in the United Kingdom on 14 March 2012 for digital download. The song features vocals from British singer and rapper Example, who later included the song as a bonus track in the deluxe version of his fourth studio album, The Evolution of Man.

Music video
A music video to accompany the release of "Daydreamer" was first released onto YouTube on 6 March 2012 at a total length of three minutes and thirty-seven seconds.

Track listings

Chart performance

Release history

References 

2012 singles
2010 songs
Flux Pavilion songs
Example (musician) songs
Songs written by Example (musician)
Songs written by Flux Pavilion
Song recordings produced by Flux Pavilion
Warner Music Group singles